Shon may refer to:

 Shon (given name)
 Shon (Korean surname)
 Shon the Piper, a 1913 American silent short film
 a character in the ancient Indian epic Mahabharata

See also
 Schön!, a fashion magazine
 Sean (disambiguation)